George Walsh (1889–1981) was an American actor and brother of Raoul Walsh.

George Walsh may also refer to:

 George Walsh (MP for Eye) (–1692), English MP
 George H. Walsh (1845–1913), American newspaper editor
 George Walsh (New Zealand politician) (1899–1979), New Zealand MP
 George Walsh (cricketer) (1852–1904), English cricketer